

Canadian Football News in 1929
CRU adopted use of the forward pass on a limited basis in Junior, Interscholastic, Western Canada Rugby Union, Western Intercollegiate Union and the Grey Cup final.

The first legal pass in Canada was thrown by Gerry Seiberling and the first reception was by Ralph Losie of Calgary Altomah-Tigers against Edmonton on September 21. Jersey Jack Campbell of Regina threw the first forward pass in a Grey Cup game and Jerry Erskine made the first reception. The first touchdown pass was by Edmonton's Joe Cook to Pal Power in the second quarter of a game against the University of Alberta on September 28. The first interception return for a touchdown was by Joe Hess of the University of Alberta in the same game when he caught a pass by Cook.

Regular season

Final regular season standings
Note: GP = Games Played, W = Wins, L = Losses, T = Ties, PF = Points For, PA = Points Against, Pts = Points
*Bold text means that they have clinched the playoffs

League Champions

Grey Cup playoffs
Note: All dates in 1929

ARFU Edmonton City Championship

MRFU Tie-Breaker

The Winnipeg St.John's advance to western playoff versus the Regina Roughriders

ORFU final

Sarnia advances to the East Semifinal.

CIRFU final

Queen's advances to the East Final.

East semifinal

Hamilton advances to the East Final.

East final

Hamilton advances to the Grey Cup game.

West semifinal

Regina advances to the West Final.

West final

Due to the BCRFU schedule being declared too long for the WCRFU playoffs Regina advances directly to the Grey Cup game.

Playoff bracket

Grey Cup Championship

1929 Canadian Football Awards
 Jeff Russel Memorial Trophy (IRFU MVP) – Red Wilson (?), Toronto Argonauts

References

 
Canadian Football League seasons